Richard Jacobs Haldeman (May 19, 1831 – October 1, 1886) was a Democratic member of the U.S. House of Representatives from Pennsylvania for two terms from 1869 to 1873.

Life and career

Education
Richard J. Haldeman was born in Harrisburg, Pennsylvania.  He pursued an academic course, and was graduated from Yale College in 1851.  While at Yale, he was a member of the Skull and Bones Society. He also attended Heidelberg and Berlin Universities.

Political career
He served as United States attaché of the legation at Paris in 1853 and later occupied similar positions at St. Petersburg and Vienna.

He returned to Harrisburg and purchased the Daily and Weekly Patriot and Union and was its editor until 1860.  He was a delegate to the Democratic National Conventions at Baltimore, Maryland, and Charleston, South Carolina, in 1860.

Congress
Haldeman was elected as a Democrat to the Forty-first and Forty-second Congresses.  He was not a candidate for renomination in 1872.  He retired from active pursuits, and died in Harrisburg in 1886.  Interment in Harrisburg Cemetery.

References

Sources

The Political Graveyard

External links

1831 births
1886 deaths
American newspaper editors
Burials at Harrisburg Cemetery
Politicians from Harrisburg, Pennsylvania
Yale College alumni
Humboldt University of Berlin alumni
University of Helmstedt alumni
Democratic Party members of the United States House of Representatives from Pennsylvania
19th-century American journalists
American male journalists
19th-century American male writers
19th-century American politicians
Journalists from Pennsylvania